Memory space is a concept related to collective memory, stating that certain places, objects or events can have special significance related to group's remembrance. The concept has been coined by French historian Pierre Nora who defines them as “complex things. At once natural and artificial, simple and ambiguous, concrete and abstract, they are lieux—places, sites, causes—in three senses—material, symbolic and functional”

References

Further reading

Memory